Fields of Glory is a  real-time strategy video game published by MicroProse in 1993.  In the game players can re-enact the four major historical battles in Napoleon's Waterloo campaign (The Battle of Ligny, Battle of Quatre-Bras, Battle of Waterloo and the Battle of Wavre), as well play two hypothetical battles (at Nivelles and Wagnee) which would have possibly taken place had some of the pre-campaign maneuvering been done differently. The battles in the game are fought in real-time, and strive to create a sense of realism. It is based on a series of tabletop games of the same name.

Reception

Computer Gaming World in July 1994 rated Fields of Glory three stars out of five. The reviewer praised the in-game database as "one of the best orders of battle ever developed for the computer, and almost justifies the game's purchase by itself", and the accurate terrain. He criticized the "incapable" AI, and real-time combat as being too fast at brigade level and too slow at corps level; as the game required both levels to win, he said that the Waterloo battle was too large to manage. The reviewer recommended the "challenging and interesting" game only to wargamers interested in the historical era.

References

External links

Fields of Glory at Amiga Hall of Light

1993 video games
Amiga games
Amiga 1200 games
Amiga CD32 games
DOS games
MicroProse games
Napoleonic Wars video games
Real-time strategy video games
Spectrum HoloByte games
Video games developed in the United States
Video games scored by John Broomhall